Drakenstein Lion Park is a zoological park in Drakenstein, Western Cape, South Africa. It was established in 1998 to keep lions which could not be rehabilitated into the wilderness, and was meant to replace the now-defunct Tygerberg Zoo, which housed possible descendants of the Cape lion, amongst other animals. Other animals included chimpanzees and tigers, including from Novosibirsk Zoo, from where Tygerberg's director John Spence managed to obtain his lions.

See also 
 Addis Ababa Lion Zoo
 Rabat Zoo

References

External links 
 Drakenstein Lion Park Cape Town South Africa

Drakenstein
Zoos in South Africa